is a small coastal city located in Ōita Prefecture, Kyushu, Japan. It is located on the Kunisaki Peninsula facing the Seto Inland Sea. Mostly covered by forests and farmlands, the peninsula is dotted with temples. The modern city of Kunisaki was founded on March 31, 2006, from the merger of the former town of Kunisaki, absorbing the towns of Aki, Kunimi and Musashi (all from Higashikunisaki District).

Oita Airport is located in Kunisaki.

History

Nuclear-free zone 
On June 25, 2008, the City of Kunisaki declared itself a 'Nuclear-free Peace City" in wishing the abolition of nuclear weapons and world permanent peace.

Geography 

Located in northern Kyushu and the north east of Oita prefecture.

Mountains
 Mt. Futago (Futago-san) at 720m and the tallest
 Mt. Monju (Monju-san)
 Mt. Odomure
 Mt. Otake
 Mt. Takeshi Washinosu
 Mt. Fudo (or Hudo)

Climate
Kunisaki has a humid subtropical climate (Köppen climate classification Cfa) with hot summers and cool winters. Precipitation is significant throughout the year, but is somewhat lower in winter.

Geology 

The Kunisaki Peninsula is formed from large conical volcanoes, including the  Mt. Futago. Twenty-eight ravines radiate outward from the peninsula’s center.

Demographics
Per Japanese census data, the population of Kunisaki in 2020 is 26,232 people. Kunisaki has been conducting censuses since 1920.

Population data for Kunisaki, as of 30 September 2011

Population distribution (2005 Census)

Industry 
The following major companies are based in Kunisaki.
 Canon Inc
 Sony Semiconductor Corporation

Education

Elementary schools

Kunisaki-machi
 Tomiku Elementary School
 Kunisaki Elementary School
 Owara Elementary School
 Asahi Elementary School

Musashi-machi
 Musashi Nishi Elementary School
 Musashi Higashi Elementary School

Aki-machi
 Aki Chuo Elementary School
 Aki Elementary School

Kunimi-machi
 Taketazu Elementary School
 Imi Elementary School
 Kumage SElementary School

Junior high schools
 Kunisaki Junior High School
 Musashi Junior High School
 Aki Junior High School
 Kunimi Junior High School

Transportation 
 Oita Airport

Access
 1 hr 30 mins by air from Tokyo Haneda airport to Oita airport
 55 mins by air from Osaka Itami airport/Kansai International Airport to Oita airport
 1 hr 10 mins from Nagoya Chubu International Airport to Oita airport

Tourism 
 Gyonyu Dam and Lake Taro

Temples 
 Futago-ji
 Monjusen-ji
 Senpuku-ji (also Sempuku-ji)
 Iwato-ji
 Ankoku-ji
 Joubutsu-ji
 Tomiku-ji

Notable people from Kunisaki
 Tatsumi Fujinami, Japanese professional wrestler
 Toyohiko Yoshida, former Japanese baseball pitcher (Nippon Professional Baseball)

References

External links

 

Cities in Ōita Prefecture